Christos Karouzos (Greek: Χρήστος Καρούζος; Amfissa, 14 March 1900 – Athens, 30 March 1967) was a Greek archaeologist and academic with significant contributions to Greek archaeology. He was director of the National Archaeological Museum of Athens and a member of the Academy of Athens (elected in 1955).

References 

Greek archaeologists
Classical archaeologists
1900 births
1967 deaths
Greek curators
20th-century archaeologists
Members of the Academy of Athens (modern)
People from Amfissa